A double standard is the application of different sets of principles for situations that are, in principle, the same. It is often used to describe treatment whereby one group is given more latitude than another. A double standard arises when two or more people, groups, organizations, circumstances, or events are treated differently even though they should be treated the same way. A double standard "implies that two things which are the same are measured by different standards".

Applying different principles to similar situations may or may not indicate a double standard. To distinguish between the application of a double standard and a valid application of different standards toward circumstances that only appear to be the same, several factors must be examined. One is the sameness of those circumstances – what are the parallels between those circumstances, and in what ways do they differ? Another is the philosophy or belief system informing which principles should be applied to those circumstances. Different standards can be applied to situations that appear similar based on a qualifying truth or fact that, upon closer examination, renders those situations distinct (a physical reality or moral obligation, for example). However, if similar-looking situations have been treated according to different principles and there is no truth, fact or principle that distinguishes those situations, then a double standard has been applied.

If correctly identified, a double standard usually indicates the presence of hypocrisy, bias or unjust behaviors.

Causes and explanations
Double standards are believed to develop in people's minds for a multitude of possible reasons, including: finding an excuse for oneself, emotions clouding judgement, twisting facts to support beliefs (such as confirmation biases, cognitive biases, attraction biases, prejudices or the desire to be right). Human beings have a tendency to evaluate people's actions based on who did them.

In a study conducted in 2000, Dr. Martha Foschi observed the application of double standards in group competency tests. She concluded that status characteristics, such as gender, ethnicity and socioeconomic class, can provide a basis for the formation of double standards in which stricter standards are applied to people who are perceived to be of lower status. Dr. Foschi also noted the ways in which double standards can form based on other socially valued attributes such as beauty, morality, and mental health.

Dr. Tristan Botelho and Dr. Mabel Abraham, Assistant Professors at the Yale School of Management and Columbia Business School, studied the effect that gender has on the way people rank others in financial markets. Their research showed that average-quality men were given the benefit of the doubt more than average-quality women, who were more often "penalized" in people's judgments. Botelho and Abraham also showed that women and men are similarly risk-loving, contrary to popular belief. Altogether, their research showed that double standards (at least in financial markets) do exist around gender. They encourage the adoption of controls to eliminate gender bias in application, hiring, and evaluation processes within organizations. Examples of such controls include using only initials on applications so that applicants' genders are not apparent, or auditioning musicians from behind a screen so that their skills, and not their gender, influence their acceptance or rejection into orchestras. Practices like these are, according to Botelho and Abraham, already being implemented in a number of organizations.

Examples and common issues

Gender
It has long been debated how someone's gender role affects others' moral, social, political and legal responses. Some believe that differences in the way men and women are perceived and treated is a function of social norms, thus indicating a double standard. One claim is that a double standard exists in society's judgment of women's and men's sexual conduct. Research has found that casual sexual activity is regarded as more acceptable for men than for women. According to William G Axinn, double standards between men and women can potentially exist with regards to: dating, cohabitation, virginity, marriage/remarriage, sexual abuse/assault/harassment, domestic violence and singleness.

Other research contends that women are held to stricter standards of competence than men are, as shown in studies involving the completion of perceptual tasks.

Law
A double standard may arise if two or more groups who have equal legal rights are given different degrees of legal protection or representation. Such double standards are seen as unjustified because they violate a common maxim of modern legal jurisprudence - that all parties should stand equal before the law. Where judges are expected to be impartial, they must apply the same standards to all people, regardless of their own subjective biases or favoritism, based on: social class, rank, ethnicity, gender, sexual orientation, religion, age or other distinctions.

Politics
A double standard arises in politics when the treatment of the same political matters between two or more parties (such as the response to a public crisis or the allocation of funding) is handled differently. This could occur because of the nature of political relationships between those tasked with these matters, the degree of reward or power that stands to be gained/lost, or the personal biases/prejudices of politicians.

Double standard policies can include situations when a country's or commentator's assessment of the same phenomenon, process or event in international relations depends on their relationship with or attitude to the parties involved. In Harry's Game (1975), Gerald Seymour wrote: "One man's terrorist is another man's freedom fighter".

Ethnicity
Double standards exist when people are preferred or rejected on the basis of their ethnicity in situations in which ethnicity is not a relevant or justifiable factor for discrimination (as might be the case for a cultural performance or ethnic ceremony).

The intentional efforts of some people to counteract racism and ethnic double standards can sometimes be interpreted by others as actually perpetuating racism and double standards among ethnic groups. Writing for The American Conservative, Rod Dreher quotes the account published in Quillette by Coleman Hughes, a black student at Columbia University, who said he was given an opportunity to play in a backup band for Grammy Award-winning pop artist Rihanna at the 2016 MTV Video Music Awards Show. According to Hughes, several of his friends were also invited; however, one of them was fired and replaced because, according to Hughes, his white Hispanic background did not suit the all-black aesthetic that Rihanna's team had chosen for her show. The team had decided that all performers on stage were to be black, aside from Rihanna's regular guitar player. Hughes was uncertain about whether he believed this action was unethical, given that the show was racially themed to begin with. He observed what he believed to be a double standard in the entertainment industry, saying, "if a black musician had been fired in order to achieve an all-white aesthetic — it would have made front page headlines. It would have been seen as an unambiguous moral infraction." 
Dreher argues that Hughes's observations highlight the difficulty in distinguishing between the exclusion of one ethnic group in order to celebrate another, and the exclusion of an ethnic group as the exercise of racism or a double standard. Dreher also discussed another incident, in which New York Times columnist Bari Weiss, who is Jewish, was heavily criticized for tweeting, "Immigrants: They get the job done", in a positive reference to Mirai Nagasu, a Japanese-American Olympic ice skater, who Weiss was trying to honor. The public debate about ethnicity and double standards remains controversial and, by all appearances, will continue.

See also

 Discrimination
 Double bind
 Doublethink
 Golden rule/ethic of reciprocity
 Hypocrisy
 Political hypocrisy
 Quod licet Iovi, non licet bovi
 Psychological projection
 Reciprocity (social and political philosophy)

References

Further reading
 Axinn, William G., et al. "Gender Double Standards in Parenting Attitudes." Social Science Research, vol. 40, no. 2, 2011, pp. 417–432., doi:10.1016/j.ssresearch.2010.08.010.
  327 pages.
  440 pages.
 Hudspeth, Christopher. "8 Modern Day Double Standards." Thought Catalog, 26 July 2012, thoughtcatalog.com/cehudspeth/2012/07/8-modern-day-double-standards/.
  127 pages.

 Thomas, Keith. "The Double Standard." Journal of the History of Ideas, vol. 20, no. 2, Apr. 1959, pp. 195–216., doi:10.2307/2707819.
  37 pages.

Injustice
Barriers to critical thinking
Discrimination
Social inequality
Cognitive dissonance
Hypocrisy
Bias